The Magdeburg Region is the name of the central region in the state of Saxony-Anhalt in North Germany. It includes the landscape units of Magdeburg Börde, Jerichow Land, the northern Harz Foreland and the Colbitz-Letzlingen Heath. The centre of the region is the city of Magdeburg; other important towns are Haldensleben, Aschersleben, Staßfurt, Oschersleben, Schönebeck (Elbe) and Burg. Towards the east the Elbe-Börde Heath transitions into the neighbouring region of Anhalt-Wittenberg. To the south lies the Harz and the Saale-Unstrut Region, to the north the Altmark. The regional tourist association uses the name Elbe-Börde-Heide which came originally from regional planning and was first coined in the 1990s. Currently it is used in the fields of tourism or regional marketing.

Districts 
Landkreis Börde
Landkreis Jerichower Land
Salzlandkreis
Landeshauptstadt Magdeburg 

The communes of the Elbe-Börde Heath strive to produce a common infrastructure plan and common marketing and representation externally.

External links 
www.elbe-boerde-heide.de
www.regionmagdeburg.de

Regions of Saxony-Anhalt